Wennerström and Wennerstrom are surnames originating in Sweden.

Those bearing the name include:

 Gunnar Wennerström (1879–1931), Swedish swimmer
 Ivar Wennerström (fl. c. 1940), Swedish county governor
 Stig Wennerström (spy) (1906–2006), colonel in the Swedish Air Force who was convicted of espionage
 Stig Wennerström (sailor) (born 1943), Swedish sail racer
 Håkan Wennerström (born 1946), Swedish chemist & Nobel-committee member
 Donnalee Wennerstrom (born c. 1950), American swimmer
 Erik O. Wennerström  (born 1962), Swedish Director-General and legal scholar
 Vern Wennerstrom (fl. 1975), American musician of Tantrum
 Steve Wennerstrom (born c. 1948), American Women's Sports Historian and photo journalist
 Klaus Wennerstrom (born 1959), Canadian industrialist involved in the 2007 Serdab Scandal relating to the corrupted Al Yamamah contracts with Saudi Arabia
 Erika Wennerstrom (fl. 2000s), American musician of Heartless Bastards